Danielle Hennig (born December 23, 1990 in Kelowna, British Columbia) is a female field hockey player, who played for the Canada national field hockey team as a defender at the 2011 Pan American Games, 2013 Women's Pan American Cup, and 2014 Commonwealth Games, and the 2015 Pan American Games, 2018 Commonwealth games, and 2019 Pan American games where the team won a historic silver medal. After just narrowly missing out on qualifying for the 2020 Olympics, Danielle retired in December of 2021, at the time being the second highest capped female player ever for Canada having played 200 official international matches over her career.

References

External links
 
 
 

1990 births
Living people
Canadian female field hockey players
Field hockey people from British Columbia
Field hockey players at the 2011 Pan American Games
Field hockey players at the 2015 Pan American Games
Sportspeople from Kelowna
Pan American Games bronze medalists for Canada
Pan American Games medalists in field hockey
Pan American Games silver medalists for Canada
Field hockey players at the 2019 Pan American Games
Medalists at the 2015 Pan American Games
Medalists at the 2019 Pan American Games
Field hockey players at the 2014 Commonwealth Games
Commonwealth Games competitors for Canada